Montgomery Reef is a reef off the Kimberley coast of Western Australia. It is situated at the south western end of Camden Sound and surrounds Yawajaba (Montgomery) Island.

The reef and island were named by Philip Parker King, the first European to sight the island, aboard , while exploring the area in 1818. King named the island after the ship's surgeon, Andrew Montgomery. King also named Doubtful Bay.

When the tide is out, vast lagoons, sandstone islets, and a central mangrove island are revealed. The outward movement of the tide forms a torrent of water, creating a river cutting through the reef and hundreds of cascading waterfalls.

While the tide is going out, the waterfalls attract migratory wading birds, feeding turtles, manta rays, black tipped reef sharks, and dugongs. The area is a popular tourist site and has several cruise operators visiting daily.

References

Islands of the Kimberley (Western Australia)